Breeze Sans is a humanist sans-serif typeface for the Latin, Greek, and Cyrillic writing systems designed by Dalton Maag for Samsung. It is the user interface font of the Tizen operating system (starting with Tizen 2.4) and the Samsung Galaxy Watch.

Previous versions used Tizen Sans, a separate typeface designed by Fontrix. Tizen also uses fallback Breeze Sans fonts for other writing systems designed by Fontrix.

Breeze Sans is available in five weights (Thin, Light, Regular, Medium and Bold) with condensed styles to complement them. There are no italic or oblique styles however.

Notes and references

External links

 Breeze Sans on Samsung Developer
Breeze Sans on Tizen Developer

Humanist sans-serif typefaces
Open-source typefaces
Corporate typefaces
Typefaces and fonts introduced in 2013
Dalton Maag typefaces